Charles Henry Gould (December 6, 1855 – July 30, 1919) was a Canadian librarian and musician.

Gould attended the High School of Montreal and McGill University, receiving his bachelor's degree in 1877. He started graduate work in physics but never took a further degree. From 1880 to 1887 he was the organist of the American Presbyterian Church in Montreal.  In 1892, Gould was appointed as the first university librarian at McGill University. Gould began his service as librarian by traveling through Europe and the United States to learn library administration.

Gould contributed greatly to Canadian culture, scholarship, and librarianship. He hosted the American Library Association's annual meeting in Montreal in 1900 and during that meeting participated in founding the first Canadian library association which became the Ontario Library Association. Gould started the first bibliographical control system for Canadian science. In 1904 Gould started a summer school that became the McGill Library School. Gould is credited with the creation of the modern system of interlibrary loan. In 1916 he chaired the committee of the ALA that produced the first policies for interlibrary loan among libraries.

Gould served as the first Canadian president of the American Library Association from 1908 to 1909. During his tenure, he oversaw the relocation of the ALA headquarters from Boston to Chicago and the adoption of a new constitution for the Association.  Gould also served as president of the Bibliographical Society of America from 1912 to 1913.

See also
 McGill University Library
 American Library Association
 interlibrary loan

References

External links
 ALA President C. H. Gould in Bretton Woods, White Mountains, New Hampshire in the American Library Association Archives – Digital Collections
 Charles Henry Gould biography at Ex Libris Association

 
 

Canadian librarians
1855 births
1919 deaths
High School of Montreal alumni
McGill University alumni